Francisco Guerrero is the name of:
Francisco Guerrero (composer) (1528–1599), Spanish composer of the Renaissance
Francisco Guerrero (politician) (1811–1851), Alcalde of San Francisco
Francisco Guerrero Marín (1951–1997), Spanish composer of the 20th century 
Francisco Guerrero (footballer, born 1934), Spanish footballer
Francisco Guerrero (footballer, born 1977), Argentine footballer
Francisco Guerrero (comics), the secret identity of comic book superhero El Gato Negro
Francisco Guerrero Pérez (1840-1910), Mexican serial killer